The Cold War was a period of geopolitical tension between the United States and the Soviet Union and their respective allies, the Western Bloc and the Eastern Bloc. The term cold war is used because there was no large-scale fighting directly between the two superpowers, but they each supported opposing sides in major regional conflicts known as proxy wars. The conflict was based on the ideological and geopolitical struggle for global influence by these two superpowers, following their temporary alliance and victory against Nazi Germany and Imperial Japan in 1945. Aside from the nuclear arsenal development and conventional military deployment, the struggle for dominance was expressed via indirect means such as psychological warfare, propaganda campaigns, espionage, far-reaching embargoes, rivalry at sports events, and technological competitions such as the Space Race.

The Western Bloc was led by the United States as well as a number of other First World nations that were generally liberal democratic but tied to a network of often authoritarian states, most of which were their former colonies. The Eastern Bloc was led by the Soviet Union and its Communist Party, which had an influence across the Second World and was also tied to a network of authoritarian states. The US government supported anti-communist and right-wing governments and uprisings across the world, while the Soviet government funded left-wing parties and revolutions around the world. As nearly all the colonial states achieved independence in the period from 1945 to 1960, many became Third World battlefields in the Cold War.

The first phase of the Cold War began shortly after the end of World War II in 1945. The United States and its allies created the NATO military alliance in 1949 in the apprehension of a Soviet attack and termed their global policy against Soviet influence containment. The Soviet Union formed the Warsaw Pact in 1955 in response to NATO. Major crises of this phase included the 1948–1949 Berlin Blockade, the 1945–1949 Chinese Communist Revolution, the 1950–1953 Korean War, the 1956 Hungarian Revolution, the 1956 Suez Crisis, the 1961 Berlin Crisis, the 1962 Cuban Missile Crisis, and the 1964–1975 Vietnam War. The US and the USSR competed for influence in Latin America, the Middle East, and the decolonizing states of Africa, Asia, and Oceania.

Following the Cuban Missile Crisis, a new phase began that saw the Sino-Soviet split between China and the Soviet Union complicate relations within the communist sphere, leading to a series of border confrontations, while France, a Western Bloc state, began to demand greater autonomy of action. The USSR invaded Czechoslovakia to suppress the 1968 Prague Spring, while the US experienced internal turmoil from the civil rights movement and opposition to the Vietnam War. In the 1960s–1970s, an international peace movement took root among citizens around the world. Movements against nuclear weapons testing and for nuclear disarmament took place, with large anti-war protests. By the 1970s, both sides had started making allowances for peace and security, ushering in a period of détente that saw the Strategic Arms Limitation Talks and the US opening relations with the People's Republic of China as a strategic counterweight to the USSR. A number of self-proclaimed Marxist–Leninist governments were formed in the second half of the 1970s in developing countries, including Angola, Mozambique, Ethiopia, Cambodia, Afghanistan, and Nicaragua.

Détente collapsed at the end of the decade with the beginning of the Soviet–Afghan War in 1979. The early 1980s was another period of elevated tension. The United States increased diplomatic, military, and economic pressures on the Soviet Union, at a time when it was already suffering from economic stagnation. In the mid-1980s, the new Soviet leader Mikhail Gorbachev introduced the liberalizing reforms of glasnost ("openness", c. 1985) and perestroika ("reorganization", 1987) and ended Soviet involvement in Afghanistan in 1989. Pressures for national sovereignty grew stronger in Eastern Europe, and Gorbachev refused to militarily support their governments any longer.

In 1989, the fall of the Iron Curtain after the Pan-European Picnic and a peaceful wave of revolutions (with the exception of Romania and Afghanistan) overthrew almost all of the governments of the Eastern Bloc. The Communist Party of the Soviet Union itself lost control in the country and was banned following an abortive coup attempt in August 1991. This in turn led to the formal dissolution of the Soviet Union in December 1991, the independence of its constituent republics, and the collapse of communist governments across much of Africa and Asia. The United States was left as the world's sole superpower.

The Cold War and its events have left a significant legacy. It is often referred to in popular culture, especially with themes of espionage and the threat of nuclear warfare. For subsequent history, see international relations since 1989.

Origins of the term

At the end of World War II, English writer George Orwell used cold war, as a general term, in his essay "You and the Atomic Bomb", published 19 October 1945 in the British newspaper Tribune. Contemplating a world living in the shadow of the threat of nuclear warfare, Orwell looked at James Burnham's predictions of a polarized world, writing:

In The Observer of 10 March 1946, Orwell wrote, "after the Moscow conference last December, Russia began to make a 'cold war' on Britain and the British Empire."

The first use of the term to describe the specific post-war geopolitical confrontation between the Soviet Union and the United States came in a speech by Bernard Baruch, an influential advisor to Democratic presidents, on 16 April 1947. The speech, written by a journalist Herbert Bayard Swope, proclaimed, "Let us not be deceived: we are today in the midst of a cold war." Newspaper columnist Walter Lippmann gave the term wide currency with his book The Cold War. When asked in 1947 about the source of the term, Lippmann traced it to a French term from the 1930s, .

Background

Russian Revolution

While most historians trace the origins of the Cold War to the period immediately following World War II, some argue that it began with the October Revolution in Russia in 1917 when the Bolsheviks took power. In World War I, the British, French and Russian Empires had composed the major Allied Powers from the start, and the US joined them as a self-styled Associated Power in April 1917. The Bolsheviks seized power in Russia in November 1917 and fulfilled their promise to withdraw from WWI, and German armies advanced rapidly across the borderlands. The Allies responded with an economic blockade against all of Russia. In early March 1918, the Soviets followed through on the wave of popular disgust against the war and accepted harsh German peace terms with the Treaty of Brest-Litovsk. In the eyes of some Allies, Russia now was helping Germany to win the war by freeing up a million German soldiers for the Western Front and by relinquishing much of Russia's food supply, industrial base, fuel supplies, and communications with Western Europe. According to historian Spencer Tucker, the Allies felt, "The treaty was the ultimate betrayal of the Allied cause and sowed the seeds for the Cold War. With Brest-Litovsk the spectre of German domination in Eastern Europe threatened to become reality, and the Allies now began to think seriously about military intervention," and proceeded to step up their "economic warfare" against the Bolsheviks. Some Bolsheviks saw Russia as only the first step, planning to incite revolutions against capitalism in every western country, but the need for peace with Germany led Soviet leader Vladimir Lenin away from this position.

In 1918, Britain provided money and troops to support the anti-Bolshevik "White" counter-revolutionaries. This policy was spearheaded by Minister of War Winston Churchill, a committed British imperialist and anti-communist. France, Japan and the United States invaded Russia in an attempt to topple the new Soviet government. Despite the economic and military warfare launched against it by Western powers, the Bolshevik government succeeded in defeating all opposition and took full control of Russia, as well as breakaway provinces such as Ukraine, Georgia, Armenia, and Azerbaijan.

Western powers also diplomatically isolated the Soviet government. Lenin stated that the Soviet Union was surrounded by a "hostile capitalist encirclement" and he viewed diplomacy as a weapon to keep Soviet enemies divided. He set up an organization to promote sister revolutions worldwide, the Comintern. It failed everywhere; it failed badly when it tried to start revolutions in Germany, Bavaria, and Hungary. The failures led to an inward turn by Moscow.

Britain and other Western powers—except the United States—did business and sometimes recognized the new Soviet Union. By 1933, old fears of Communist threats had faded, and the American business community, as well as newspaper editors, were calling for diplomatic recognition. President Franklin D. Roosevelt used presidential authority to normalize relations in November 1933. However, there was no progress on the Tsarist debts Washington wanted Moscow to repay. Expectations of expanded trade proved unrealistic. Historians Justus D. Doenecke and Mark A. Stoler note that, "Both nations were soon disillusioned by the accord." Roosevelt named William Bullitt as ambassador from 1933 to 1936. Bullitt arrived in Moscow with high hopes for Soviet–American relations, but his view of the Soviet leadership soured on closer inspection. By the end of his tenure, Bullitt was openly hostile to the Soviet government, and he remained an outspoken anti-communist for the rest of his life.

World War II
In the late 1930s, Joseph Stalin had worked with Foreign Minister Maxim Litvinov to promote popular fronts with capitalist parties and governments to oppose fascism. The Soviets were embittered when Western governments chose to practice appeasement with Nazi Germany instead. In March 1939 Britain and France—without consulting the USSR—granted Hitler control of much of Czechoslovakia at the Munich Agreement. Facing an aggressive Japan at Soviet borders as well, Stalin changed directions and replaced Litvinov with Vyacheslav Molotov, who negotiated closer relations with Germany.

After signing the Molotov–Ribbentrop Pact and German–Soviet Frontier Treaty, the Soviet Union forced the Baltic countries—Estonia, Latvia, and Lithuania—to allow it to station Soviet troops in their countries. Finland rejected territorial demands, prompting a Soviet invasion in November 1939. The resulting Winter War ended in March 1940 with Finnish concessions. Britain and France, treating the Soviet attack on Finland as tantamount to its entering the war on the side of the Germans, responded to the Soviet invasion by supporting the USSR's expulsion from the League of Nations.

In June 1940, the Soviet Union forcibly annexed Estonia, Latvia, and Lithuania. It also seized the Romanian regions of Bessarabia, Northern Bukovina, and the Hertsa region. But after the German Army invaded the Soviet Union in Operation Barbarossa in June 1941 and declared war on the United States in December 1941, the Soviet Union and the Allied powers worked together to fight Germany. Britain signed a formal alliance, broadened to a military and political alliance in 1942, and the United States made an informal agreement. In wartime, the United States supplied Britain, the Soviet Union and other Allied nations through its Lend-Lease Program.  Stalin remained highly suspicious, and he believed that the British and the Americans had conspired to ensure that the Soviets bore the brunt of the fighting against Germany. According to this view, the Western Allies had deliberately delayed opening a second anti-German front in order to step in at the last minute and shape the peace settlement. Thus, Soviet perceptions of the West left a strong undercurrent of tension and hostility between the Allied powers.

Wartime conferences regarding post-war Europe

The Allies disagreed about how the European map should look, and how borders would be drawn, following the war. Each side held dissimilar ideas regarding the establishment and maintenance of post-war security. Some scholars contend that all the Western Allies desired a security system in which democratic governments were established as widely as possible, permitting countries to peacefully resolve differences through international organizations. Others note that the Atlantic powers were divided in their vision of the new post-war world. Roosevelt's goals—military victory in both Europe and Asia, the achievement of global American economic supremacy over the British Empire, and the creation of a world peace organization—were more global than Churchill's, which were mainly centered on securing control over the Mediterranean, ensuring the survival of the British Empire, and the independence of Central and Eastern European countries as a buffer between the Soviet Union and the United Kingdom.

The Soviet Union sought to dominate the internal affairs of countries in its border regions. During the war, Stalin had created special training centers for communists from different countries so that they could set up secret police forces loyal to Moscow as soon as the Red Army took control. Soviet agents took control of the media, especially radio; they quickly harassed and then banned all independent civic institutions, from youth groups to schools, churches and rival political parties. Stalin also sought continued peace with Britain and the United States, hoping to focus on internal reconstruction and economic growth.

In the American view, Stalin seemed a potential ally in accomplishing their goals, whereas in the British approach Stalin appeared as the greatest threat to the fulfillment of their agenda. With the Soviets already occupying most of Central and Eastern Europe, Stalin was at an advantage, and the two western leaders vied for his favors.

The differences between Roosevelt and Churchill led to several separate deals with the Soviets. In October 1944, Churchill traveled to Moscow and proposed the "percentages agreement" to divide Europe into respective spheres of influence, including giving Stalin predominance over Romania, Hungary, and Bulgaria and Churchill carte blanche over Greece. This proposal was accepted by Stalin. At the Yalta Conference of February 1945, Roosevelt signed a separate deal with Stalin regarding Asia and refused to support Churchill on the issues of Poland and Reparations. Roosevelt ultimately approved the percentage agreement, but there was still apparently no firm consensus on the framework for a post-war settlement in Europe.

At the Second Quebec Conference, a high-level military conference held in Quebec City, 12–16 September 1944, Churchill and Roosevelt reached agreement on a number of matters, including a plan for Germany based on Henry Morgenthau Jr.'s original proposal. The memorandum drafted by Churchill provided for "eliminating the warmaking industries in the Ruhr and the Saar ... looking forward to converting Germany into a country primarily agricultural and pastoral in its character." However, it no longer included a plan to partition the country into several independent states.
On 10 May 1945, President Truman signed the US occupation directive JCS 1067, which was in effect for over two years and was enthusiastically supported by Stalin. It directed the US forces of occupation to "...take no steps looking toward the economic rehabilitation of Germany".

In April 1945, President Roosevelt died and was succeeded by Vice President Harry S. Truman, who distrusted Stalin and turned for advice to an elite group of foreign policy intellectuals. Both Churchill and Truman opposed, among other things, the Soviets' decision to prop up the Lublin government, the Soviet-controlled rival to the Polish government-in-exile in London, whose relations with the Soviets had been severed.

Following the Allies' May 1945 victory, the Soviets effectively occupied Central and Eastern Europe, while strong US and Western allied forces remained in Western Europe. In Germany and Austria, France, Britain, the Soviet Union, and the United States established zones of occupation and a loose framework for parceled four-power control.

The 1945 Allied conference in San Francisco established the multi-national United Nations (UN) for the maintenance of world peace, but the enforcement capacity of its Security Council was effectively paralyzed by the ability of individual members to exercise veto power. Accordingly, the UN was essentially converted into an inactive forum for exchanging polemical rhetoric, and the Soviets regarded it almost exclusively as a propaganda tribune.

Potsdam Conference and surrender of Japan

At the Potsdam Conference, which started in late July after Germany's surrender, serious differences emerged over the future development of Germany and the rest of Central and Eastern Europe. The Soviets pressed their demand made at Yalta, for $20 billion of reparations to be taken from Germany occupation zones. The Americans and British refused to fix a dollar amount for reparations, but they permitted the Soviets to remove some industry from their zones. Moreover, the participants' mounting antipathy and bellicose language served to confirm their suspicions about each other's hostile intentions and to entrench their positions. At this conference Truman informed Stalin that the United States possessed a powerful new weapon.

Postwar prelude and emergence of the two blocs (1945–1947)

The US had invited Britain into its atomic bomb project but kept it secret from the Soviet Union. Stalin was aware that the Americans were working on the atomic bomb, and he reacted to the news calmly. One week after the end of the Potsdam Conference, the US bombed Hiroshima and Nagasaki. Shortly after the attacks, Stalin protested to US officials when Truman offered the Soviets little real influence in occupied Japan. Stalin was also outraged by the actual dropping of the bombs, calling them a "superbarbarity" and claiming that "the balance has been destroyed...That cannot be." The Truman administration intended to use its ongoing nuclear weapons program to pressure the Soviet Union in international relations.

Following the war, the United States and the United Kingdom used military forces in Greece and Korea to remove indigenous governments and forces seen as communist. Under the leadership of Lyuh Woon-hyung, working secretly during the Japanese occupation, committees throughout Korea were formed to coordinate the transition to Korean independence. Following the Japanese surrender, on 28 August 1945, these committees formed the temporary national government of Korea, naming it the People's Republic of Korea (PRK) a couple of weeks later. On 8 September 1945, the United States government landed forces in Korea and thereafter established the United States Army Military Government in Korea (USAMGK) to govern Korea south of the 38th parallel north. The USAMGK outlawed the PRK government. The military governor Lieutenant-General John R. Hodge later said that "one of our missions was to break down this Communist government." Thereafter, starting with President Syngman Rhee, the U.S supported authoritarian South Korean governments, which reigned until the 1980s.

During the opening stages of World War II, the Soviet Union laid the foundation for the Eastern Bloc by invading and then annexing several countries as Soviet Socialist Republics, by agreement with Germany in the Molotov–Ribbentrop Pact. These included eastern Poland (incorporated into the Byelorussian SSR and the Ukrainian SSR), Latvia (which became the Latvian SSR), Estonia (which became the Estonian SSR), Lithuania (which became the Lithuanian SSR), part of eastern Finland (which became the Karelo-Finnish SSR) and eastern Romania (which became the Moldavian SSR).

Central and Eastern European territories that the Soviet army liberated from Germany were added to the Eastern Bloc, pursuant to the percentages agreement between Churchill and Stalin, which, however, contain provisions regarding neither Poland nor Czechoslovakia or Germany. The Soviet Union converted the territories it occupied into satellite states, such as:
 People's Republic of Bulgaria (15 September 1946)
 Romanian People's Republic (13 April 1948)
 Hungarian People's Republic (20 August 1949)

Moreover, two further socialist republics with a higher degree of independence from the Soviet Union were also established:
 People's Republic of Albania (11 January 1946)
 Socialist Federal Republic of Yugoslavia

The Soviet-style regimes that arose in the Bloc not only reproduced Soviet command economy, but also adopted the brutal methods employed by Joseph Stalin and the Soviet secret police in order to suppress both real and potential opposition. In Asia, the Red Army had overrun Manchuria in the last month of the war, and it went on to occupy the large swathe of Korean territory located north of the 38th parallel.

As part of consolidating Stalin's control over the Eastern Bloc, the People's Commissariat for Internal Affairs (NKVD), led by Lavrentiy Beria, supervised the establishment of Soviet-style secret police systems in the Bloc that were supposed to crush anti-communist resistance. When the slightest stirrings of independence emerged in the Bloc, Stalin's strategy matched that of dealing with domestic pre-war rivals: they were removed from power, put on trial, imprisoned, and in several instances, executed.

British Prime Minister Winston Churchill was concerned that, given the enormous size of Soviet forces deployed in Europe at the end of the war, and the perception that Soviet leader Joseph Stalin was unreliable, there existed a Soviet threat to Western Europe. After World War II, US officials guided Western European leaders in establishing their own secret security force to prevent subversion in the Western bloc, which evolved into Operation Gladio.

Beginning of the Cold War, containment and the Truman Doctrine (1947–1953)

Iron Curtain, Iran, Turkey, Greece, and Poland

In late February 1946, George F. Kennan's "Long Telegram" from Moscow to Washington helped to articulate the US government's increasingly hard line against the Soviets, which would become the basis for US strategy toward the Soviet Union for the duration of the Cold War. The telegram galvanized a policy debate that would eventually shape the Truman administration's Soviet policy. Washington's opposition to the Soviets accumulated after broken promises by Stalin and Molotov concerning Europe and Iran. Following the WWII Anglo-Soviet invasion of Iran, the country was occupied by the Red Army in the far north and the British in the south. Iran was used by the United States and British to supply the Soviet Union, and the Allies agreed to withdraw from Iran within six months after the cessation of hostilities. However, when this deadline came, the Soviets remained in Iran under the guise of the Azerbaijan People's Government and Kurdish Republic of Mahabad. Shortly thereafter, on 5 March, former British prime minister Winston Churchill delivered his famous "Iron Curtain" speech in Fulton, Missouri. The speech called for an Anglo-American alliance against the Soviets, whom he accused of establishing an "iron curtain" dividing Europe from "Stettin in the Baltic to Trieste in the Adriatic".

A week later, on 13 March, Stalin responded vigorously to the speech, saying that Churchill could be compared to Hitler insofar as he advocated the racial superiority of English-speaking nations so that they could satisfy their hunger for world domination, and that such a declaration was "a call for war on the USSR." The Soviet leader also dismissed the accusation that the USSR was exerting increasing control over the countries lying in its sphere. He argued that there was nothing surprising in "the fact that the Soviet Union, anxious for its future safety, [was] trying to see to it that governments loyal in their attitude to the Soviet Union should exist in these countries".

Soviet demands to Turkey regarding the Dardanelles in the Turkish Straits crisis and Black Sea border disputes were also a major factor in increasing tensions. In September, the Soviet side produced the Novikov telegram, sent by the Soviet ambassador to the US but commissioned and "co-authored" by Vyacheslav Molotov; it portrayed the US as being in the grip of monopoly capitalists who were building up military capability "to prepare the conditions for winning world supremacy in a new war". On 6 September 1946, James F. Byrnes delivered a speech in Germany repudiating the Morgenthau Plan (a proposal to partition and de-industrialize post-war Germany) and warning the Soviets that the US intended to maintain a military presence in Europe indefinitely. As Byrnes admitted a month later, "The nub of our program was to win the German people ... it was a battle between us and Russia over minds ..." In December, the Soviets agreed to withdraw from Iran after persistent US pressure, an early success of containment policy.

By 1947, US president Harry S. Truman was outraged by the perceived resistance of the Soviet Union to American demands in Iran, Turkey, and Greece, as well as Soviet rejection of the Baruch Plan on nuclear weapons. In February 1947, the British government announced that it could no longer afford to finance the Kingdom of Greece in its civil war against Communist-led insurgents. In the same month, Stalin conducted the rigged 1947 Polish legislative election which constituted an open breach of the Yalta Agreement. The US government responded to this announcement by adopting a policy of containment, with the goal of stopping the spread of communism. Truman delivered a speech calling for the allocation of $400 million to intervene in the war and unveiled the Truman Doctrine, which framed the conflict as a contest between free peoples and totalitarian regimes. American policymakers accused the Soviet Union of conspiring against the Greek royalists in an effort to expand Soviet influence even though Stalin had told the Communist Party to cooperate with the British-backed government. (The insurgents were helped by Josip Broz Tito's Socialist Federal Republic of Yugoslavia against Stalin's wishes.)

Enunciation of the Truman Doctrine marked the beginning of a US bipartisan defense and foreign policy consensus between Republicans and Democrats focused on containment and deterrence that weakened during and after the Vietnam War, but ultimately persisted thereafter. Moderate and conservative parties in Europe, as well as social democrats, gave virtually unconditional support to the Western alliance, while European and American Communists, financed by the KGB and involved in its intelligence operations, adhered to Moscow's line, although dissent began to appear after 1956. Other critiques of the consensus policy came from anti-Vietnam War activists, the Campaign for Nuclear Disarmament, and the anti-nuclear movement.

Marshall Plan, Czechoslovak coup d'état, and formation of two German states

In early 1947, France, Britain and the United States unsuccessfully attempted to reach an agreement with the Soviet Union for a plan envisioning an economically self-sufficient Germany, including a detailed accounting of the industrial plants, goods and infrastructure already removed by the Soviets. In June 1947, in accordance with the Truman Doctrine, the United States enacted the Marshall Plan, a pledge of economic assistance for all European countries willing to participate, including the Soviet Union. Under the plan, which President Harry S. Truman signed on 3 April 1948, the US government gave to Western European countries over $13 billion (equivalent to $189.39 billion in 2016) to rebuild the economy of Europe. Later, the program led to the creation of the Organisation for European Economic Co-operation.

The plan's aim was to rebuild the democratic and economic systems of Europe and to counter perceived threats to Europe's balance of power, such as communist parties seizing control through revolutions or elections. The plan also stated that European prosperity was contingent upon German economic recovery. One month later, Truman signed the National Security Act of 1947, creating a unified Department of Defense, the Central Intelligence Agency (CIA), and the National Security Council (NSC). These would become the main bureaucracies for US defense policy in the Cold War.

Stalin believed that economic integration with the West would allow Eastern Bloc countries to escape Soviet control, and that the US was trying to buy a pro-US re-alignment of Europe. Stalin therefore prevented Eastern Bloc nations from receiving Marshall Plan aid. The Soviet Union's alternative to the Marshall Plan, which was purported to involve Soviet subsidies and trade with central and eastern Europe, became known as the Molotov Plan (later institutionalized in January 1949 as the Council for Mutual Economic Assistance). Stalin was also fearful of a reconstituted Germany; his vision of a post-war Germany did not include the ability to rearm or pose any kind of threat to the Soviet Union.

In early 1948, following reports of strengthening "reactionary elements", Soviet operatives executed a coup d'état in Czechoslovakia, the only Eastern Bloc state that the Soviets had permitted to retain democratic structures. The public brutality of the coup shocked Western powers more than any event up to that point, set in motion a brief scare that war would occur, and swept away the last vestiges of opposition to the Marshall Plan in the United States Congress. resulting in the formation of Czechoslovak Socialist Republic (9 May 1948).

In an immediate aftermath of the crisis, the London Six-Power Conference was held, resulting in the Soviet boycott of the Allied Control Council and its incapacitation, an event marking the beginning of the full-blown Cold War and the end of its prelude, as well as ending any hopes at the time for a single German government and leading to formation in 1949 of the Federal Republic of Germany and German Democratic Republic (7 October 1949) to

Open hostility and escalation (1948–1962)

The twin policies of the Truman Doctrine and the Marshall Plan led to billions in economic and military aid for Western Europe, Greece, and Turkey. With the US assistance, the Greek military won its civil war. Under the leadership of Alcide De Gasperi the Italian Christian Democrats defeated the powerful Communist–Socialist alliance in the elections of 1948.

Espionage

All major powers engaged in espionage, using a great variety of spies, double agents, moles, and new technologies such as the tapping of telephone cables. The most famous and active organizations were the American CIA, the Soviet KGB (preceded by international operations of the Soviet NKVD, MGB, and GRU), and the British MI6. The East German Stasi was formally concerned with internal security, but its Main Directorate for Reconnaissance operated espionage activities around the world. The CIA secretly subsidized and promoted anti-communist cultural activities and organizations. The CIA was also involved in European politics, especially in Italy. Espionage took place all over the world, but Berlin was the most important battleground for spying activity.

Although to an extent disinformation had always existed, the term itself was invented, and the strategy formalized by a black propaganda department of the Soviet KGB.

Based on the amount of top-secret Cold War archival information that has been released, historian Raymond L. Garthoff concludes there probably was parity in the quantity and quality of secret information obtained by each side. However, the Soviets probably had an advantage in terms of HUMINT (human intelligence or interpersonal espionage)  and "sometimes in its reach into high policy circles." In terms of decisive impact, however, he concludes:
We also can now have high confidence in the judgment that there were no successful "moles" at the political decision-making level on either side. Similarly, there is no evidence, on either side, of any major political or military decision that was prematurely discovered through espionage and thwarted by the other side. There also is no evidence of any major political or military decision that was crucially influenced (much less generated) by an agent of the other side.
According to historian Robert Louis Benson, "Washington's forte was 'signals' intelligence--the procurement and analysis of coded foreign messages." leading to the Venona project or Venona intercepts, which monitored the communications of Soviet intelligence agents. Moynihan wrote that the Venona project contained "overwhelming proof of the activities of Soviet spy networks in America, complete with names, dates, places, and deeds." The Venona project was kept highly secret even from policymakers until the Moynihan Commission in 1995. Despite this, the decryption project had already been betrayed to the USSR by Kim Philby and Bill Weisband in 1946, as was discovered by the US by 1950. Nonetheless, the Soviets had to keep their discovery of the program secret, too, and continued leaking their own information, some of which was still useful to the American program. According to Moynihan, even President Truman may not have been fully informed of Venona, which may have left him unaware of the extent of Soviet espionage.

Clandestine atomic spies from the Soviet Union, who infiltrated the Manhattan Project at various points during WWII, played a major role in increasing tensions that led to the Cold War.

In addition to usual espionage, the Western agencies paid special attention to debriefing Eastern Bloc defectors. Edward Jay Epstein describes that the CIA understood that the KGB used "provocations", or fake defections, as a trick to embarrass Western intelligence and establish Soviet double agents. As a result, from 1959 to 1973, the CIA required that East Bloc defectors went through a counterintelligence investigation before being recruited as a source of intelligence.

During the late 1970s and 1980s, the KGB perfected its use of espionage to sway and distort diplomacy. Active measures were "clandestine operations designed to further Soviet foreign policy goals", consisting of disinformation, forgeries, leaks to foreign media, and the channeling of aid to militant groups. Retired KGB Major General Oleg Kalugin, former head of Foreign Counter Intelligence for the KGB (1973–1979), described active measures as "the heart and soul of Soviet intelligence".

During the Sino-Soviet split, "spy wars" also occurred between the USSR and PRC.

Cominform and the Tito–Stalin Split

In September 1947, the Soviets created Cominform to impose orthodoxy within the international communist movement and tighten political control over Soviet satellites through coordination of communist parties in the Eastern Bloc. Cominform faced an embarrassing setback the following June, when the Tito–Stalin split obliged its members to expel Yugoslavia, which remained communist but adopted a non-aligned position and began accepting money from the United States.

Besides Berlin, the status of the city of Trieste was at issue.  Until the break between Tito and Stalin, the Western powers and the Eastern bloc faced each other uncompromisingly. In addition to capitalism and communism, Italians and Slovenes, monarchists and republicans as well as war winners and losers often faced each other irreconcilably. The neutral buffer state Free Territory of Trieste, founded in 1947 with the United Nations, was split up and dissolved in 1954 and 1975, also because of the détente between the West and Tito.

Berlin Blockade and Airlift

The United States and Britain merged their western German occupation zones into "Bizonia" (1 January 1947, later "Trizonia" with the addition of France's zone, April 1949). As part of the economic rebuilding of Germany, in early 1948, representatives of a number of Western European governments and the United States announced an agreement for a merger of western German areas into a federal governmental system. In addition, in accordance with the Marshall Plan, they began to re-industrialize and rebuild the west German economy, including the introduction of a new Deutsche Mark currency to replace the old Reichsmark currency that the Soviets had debased. The US had secretly decided that a unified and neutral Germany was undesirable, with Walter Bedell Smith telling General Eisenhower "in spite of our announced position, we really do not want nor intend to accept German unification on any terms that the Russians might agree to, even though they seem to meet most of our requirements."

Shortly thereafter, Stalin instituted the Berlin Blockade (24 June 1948 – 12 May 1949), one of the first major crises of the Cold War, preventing food, materials and supplies from arriving in West Berlin. The United States, Britain, France, Canada, Australia, New Zealand and several other countries began the massive "Berlin airlift", supplying West Berlin with food and other provisions.

The Soviets mounted a public relations campaign against the policy change. Once again the East Berlin communists attempted to disrupt the Berlin municipal elections (as they had done in the 1946 elections), which were held on 5 December 1948 and produced a turnout of 86.3% and an overwhelming victory for the non-communist parties. The results effectively divided the city into East and West, the latter comprising US, British and French sectors. 300,000 Berliners demonstrated and urged the international airlift to continue, and US Air Force pilot Gail Halvorsen created "Operation Vittles", which supplied candy to German children. The Airlift was as much a logistical as a political and psychological success for the West; it firmly linked West Berlin to the United States. In May 1949, Stalin backed down and lifted the blockade.

In 1952, Stalin repeatedly proposed a plan to unify East and West Germany under a single government chosen in elections supervised by the United Nations, if the new Germany were to stay out of Western military alliances, but this proposal was turned down by the Western powers. Some sources dispute the sincerity of the proposal.

Beginnings of NATO and Radio Free Europe

Britain, France, the United States, Canada and eight other western European countries signed the North Atlantic Treaty of April 1949, establishing the North Atlantic Treaty Organization (NATO). That August, the first Soviet atomic device was detonated in Semipalatinsk, Kazakh SSR. Following Soviet refusals to participate in a German rebuilding effort set forth by western European countries in 1948, the US, Britain and France spearheaded the establishment of West Germany from the three Western zones of occupation in April 1949. The Soviet Union proclaimed its zone of occupation in Germany the German Democratic Republic that October.

Media in the Eastern Bloc was an organ of the state, completely reliant on and subservient to the communist party. Radio and television organizations were state-owned, while print media was usually owned by political organizations, mostly by the local communist party. Soviet radio broadcasts used Marxist rhetoric to attack capitalism, emphasizing themes of labor exploitation, imperialism and war-mongering.

Along with the broadcasts of the British Broadcasting Corporation (BBC) and the Voice of America to Central and Eastern Europe, a major propaganda effort begun in 1949 was Radio Free Europe/Radio Liberty, dedicated to bringing about the peaceful demise of the communist system in the Eastern Bloc. Radio Free Europe attempted to achieve these goals by serving as a surrogate home radio station, an alternative to the controlled and party-dominated domestic press. Radio Free Europe was a product of some of the most prominent architects of America's early Cold War strategy, especially those who believed that the Cold War would eventually be fought by political rather than military means, such as George F. Kennan.

American policymakers, including Kennan and John Foster Dulles, acknowledged that the Cold War was in its essence a war of ideas. The United States, acting through the CIA, funded a long list of projects to counter the communist appeal among intellectuals in Europe and the developing world. The CIA also covertly sponsored a domestic propaganda campaign called Crusade for Freedom.

German rearmament

The rearmament of West Germany was achieved in the early 1950s. The main promoter was Konrad Adenauer, the chancellor of West Germany, with France the main opponent. Washington had the decisive voice. It was strongly supported by the Pentagon (the US military leadership), and weakly opposed by President Truman; the State Department was ambivalent. The outbreak of the Korean War in June 1950 changed the calculations and Washington now gave full support. That also involved naming Dwight D. Eisenhower in charge of NATO forces, and sending more American troops to West Germany. There was a strong promise that West Germany would not develop nuclear weapons.

Widespread fears of another rise of German militarism necessitated the new military to operate within an alliance framework, under NATO command. In 1955, Washington secured full German membership of NATO. In May 1953, Lavrentiy Beria, by then in a government post, had made an unsuccessful proposal to allow the reunification of a neutral Germany to prevent West Germany's incorporation into NATO. The events led to the establishment of the Bundeswehr, the West German military, in 1955.

Chinese Civil War, SEATO, and NSC 68

In 1949, Mao Zedong's People's Liberation Army defeated Chiang Kai-shek's United States-backed Kuomintang (KMT) Nationalist Government in China. The KMT moved to Taiwan. The Kremlin promptly created an alliance with the newly formed People's Republic of China. According to Norwegian historian Odd Arne Westad, the communists won the Civil War because they made fewer military mistakes than Chiang Kai-Shek made, and because in his search for a powerful centralized government, Chiang antagonized too many interest groups in China. Moreover, his party was weakened during the war against Japan. Meanwhile, the communists told different groups, such as the peasants, exactly what they wanted to hear, and they cloaked themselves under the cover of Chinese nationalism.

Confronted with the communist revolution in China and the end of the American atomic monopoly in 1949, the Truman administration quickly moved to escalate and expand its containment doctrine. In NSC 68, a secret 1950 document, the National Security Council proposed reinforcing pro-Western alliance systems and quadrupling spending on defense. Truman, under the influence of advisor Paul Nitze, saw containment as implying complete rollback of Soviet influence in all its forms.

United States officials moved to expand this version of containment into Asia, Africa, and Latin America, in order to counter revolutionary nationalist movements, often led by communist parties financed by the USSR, fighting against the restoration of Europe's colonial empires in South-East Asia and elsewhere.  In this way, this US would exercise "preponderant power," oppose neutrality, and establish global hegemony. In the early 1950s (a period sometimes known as the "Pactomania"), the US formalized a series of alliances with Japan, South Korea, Taiwan, Australia, New Zealand, Thailand and the Philippines (notably ANZUS in 1951 and SEATO in 1954), thereby guaranteeing the United States a number of long-term military bases.

Korean War

One of the more significant examples of the implementation of containment was US intervention in the Korean War. In June 1950, after years of mutual hostilities, Kim Il-sung's North Korean People's Army invaded South Korea at the 38th parallel. Stalin had been reluctant to support the invasion but ultimately sent advisers. To Stalin's surprise, the United Nations Security Council Resolution 82 and 83 backed the defense of South Korea, although the Soviets were then boycotting meetings in protest of the fact that Taiwan, not the People's Republic of China, held a permanent seat on the council. A UN force of sixteen countries faced North Korea, although 40 percent of troops were South Korean, and about 50 percent were from the United States.

The US initially seemed to follow containment when it first entered the war. This directed the US's action to only push back North Korea across the 38th Parallel and restore South Korea's sovereignty while allowing North Korea's survival as a state. However, the success of the Inchon landing inspired the US/UN forces to pursue a rollback strategy instead and to overthrow communist North Korea, thereby allowing nationwide elections under U.N. auspices. General Douglas MacArthur then advanced across the 38th Parallel into North Korea. The Chinese, fearful of a possible US invasion, sent in a large army and defeated the U.N. forces, pushing them back below the 38th parallel. Truman publicly hinted that he might use his "ace in the hole" of the atomic bomb, but Mao was unmoved. The episode was used to support the wisdom of the containment doctrine as opposed to rollback. The Communists were later pushed to roughly around the original border, with minimal changes. Among other effects, the Korean War galvanised NATO to develop a military structure. Public opinion in countries involved, such as Great Britain, was divided for and against the war.

After the Armistice was approved in July 1953, North Korean leader Kim Il Sung created a highly centralized, totalitarian dictatorship that accorded his family unlimited power while generating a pervasive cult of personality. In the South, the American-backed dictator Syngman Rhee ran a violently anti-communist and authoritarian regime. While Rhee was overthrown in 1960, South Korea continued to be ruled by a military government of former Japanese collaborators until the re-establishment of a multi-party system in the late 1980s.

Khrushchev, Eisenhower, and de-Stalinization

In 1953, changes in political leadership on both sides shifted the dynamic of the Cold War. Dwight D. Eisenhower was inaugurated president that January. During the last 18 months of the Truman administration, the American defense budget had quadrupled, and Eisenhower moved to reduce military spending by a third while continuing to fight the Cold War effectively.

After the death of Joseph Stalin, Georgy Malenkov initially succeeded him as leader of the Soviet Union only to be quickly removed and replaced by Nikita Khrushchev. On 25 February 1956, Khrushchev shocked delegates to the 20th Congress of the Soviet Communist Party by cataloguing and denouncing Stalin's crimes. As part of a new campaign of de-Stalinization, he declared that the only way to reform and move away from Stalin's policies would be to acknowledge errors made in the past.

On 18 November 1956, while addressing Western dignitaries at a reception in Moscow's Polish embassy, Khrushchev infamously declared, "Whether you like it or not, history is on our side. We will bury you", shocking everyone present. He would later say he had not been referring to nuclear war, but the historically fated victory of communism over capitalism. In 1961, Khrushchev boasted that, even if the Soviet Union was currently behind the West, its housing shortage would disappear within ten years, consumer goods would be made abundant, and the "construction of a communist society" would be completed "in the main" within no more than two decades.

Eisenhower's secretary of state, John Foster Dulles, initiated a "New Look" for the containment strategy, calling for a greater reliance on nuclear weapons against US enemies in wartime. Dulles also enunciated the doctrine of "massive retaliation", threatening a severe US response to any Soviet aggression. Possessing nuclear superiority, for example, allowed Eisenhower to face down Soviet threats to intervene in the Middle East during the 1956 Suez Crisis. US plans for nuclear war in the late 1950s included the "systematic destruction" of 1,200 major urban centers in the Eastern Bloc and China, including Moscow, East Berlin and Beijing, with their civilian populations among the primary targets.

In spite of these threats, there were substantial hopes for détente when an upswing in diplomacy took place in 1959, including a two-week visit by Khrushchev to the US, and plans for a two-power summit for May 1960. The latter was disturbed by the U-2 spy plane scandal, however, in which Eisenhower was caught lying to the world about the intrusion of American surveillance aircraft into Soviet territory.

Warsaw Pact and Hungarian Revolution

While Stalin's death in 1953 slightly relaxed tensions, the situation in Europe remained an uneasy armed truce. The Soviets, who had already created a network of mutual assistance treaties in the Eastern Bloc by 1949, established a formal alliance therein, the Warsaw Pact, in 1955. It stood opposed to NATO.

The Hungarian Revolution of 1956 occurred shortly after Khrushchev arranged the removal of Hungary's Stalinist leader Mátyás Rákosi. In response to a popular uprising, the new regime formally disbanded the secret police, declared its intention to withdraw from the Warsaw Pact and pledged to re-establish free elections. The Soviet Army invaded. Thousands of Hungarians were arrested, imprisoned and deported to the Soviet Union, and approximately 200,000 Hungarians fled Hungary in the chaos. Hungarian leader Imre Nagy and others were executed following secret trials.

From 1957 through 1961, Khrushchev openly and repeatedly threatened the West with nuclear annihilation. He claimed that Soviet missile capabilities were far superior to those of the United States, capable of wiping out any American or European city. According to John Lewis Gaddis, Khrushchev rejected Stalin's "belief in the inevitability of war," however. The new leader declared his ultimate goal was "peaceful coexistence". In Khrushchev's formulation, peace would allow capitalism to collapse on its own, as well as giving the Soviets time to boost their military capabilities, which remained for decades until Gorbachev's later "new thinking" envisioning peaceful coexistence as an end in itself rather than a form of class struggle.

The events in Hungary produced ideological fractures within the communist parties of the world, particularly in Western Europe, with great decline in membership as many in both western and socialist countries felt disillusioned by the brutal Soviet response. The communist parties in the West would never recover from the effect the Hungarian Revolution had on their membership, a fact that was immediately recognized by some, such as the Yugoslavian politician Milovan Đilas who shortly after the revolution was crushed said that "The wound which the Hungarian Revolution inflicted on communism can never be completely healed".

Rapacki Plan and Berlin Crisis of 1958–1959

In 1957 Polish foreign minister Adam Rapacki proposed the Rapacki Plan for a nuclear free zone in central Europe. Public opinion tended to be favourable in the  West, but it was rejected by leaders of West Germany, Britain, France and the United States. They feared it would leave the powerful conventional armies of the Warsaw Pact dominant over the weaker NATO armies.

During November 1958, Khrushchev made an unsuccessful attempt to turn all of Berlin into an independent, demilitarized "free city". He gave the United States, Great Britain, and France a six-month ultimatum to withdraw their troops from the sectors they still occupied in West Berlin, or he would transfer control of Western access rights to the East Germans. Khrushchev earlier explained to Mao Zedong that "Berlin is the testicles of the West. Every time I want to make the West scream, I squeeze on Berlin." NATO formally rejected the ultimatum in mid-December and Khrushchev withdrew it in return for a Geneva conference on the German question.

American military buildup

John F. Kennedy's foreign policy was dominated by American confrontations with the Soviet Union, manifested by proxy contests. Like Truman and Eisenhower, Kennedy supported containment to stop the spread of Communism. President Eisenhower's New Look policy had emphasized the use of less expensive nuclear weapons to deter Soviet aggression by threatening massive nuclear attacks on all of the Soviet Union. Nuclear weapons were much cheaper than maintaining a large standing army, so Eisenhower cut conventional forces to save money. Kennedy implemented a new strategy known as flexible response. This strategy relied on conventional arms to achieve limited goals. As part of this policy, Kennedy expanded the United States special operations forces, elite military units that could fight unconventionally in various conflicts. Kennedy hoped that the flexible response strategy would allow the US to counter Soviet influence without resorting to nuclear war.

To support his new strategy, Kennedy ordered a massive increase in defense spending. He sought, and Congress provided, a rapid build-up of the nuclear arsenal to restore the lost superiority over the Soviet Union—he claimed in 1960 that Eisenhower had lost it because of excessive concern with budget deficits. In his inaugural address, Kennedy promised "to bear any burden" in the defense of liberty, and he repeatedly asked for increases in military spending and authorization of new weapons systems. From 1961 to 1964 the number of nuclear weapons increased by 50 percent, as did the number of B-52 bombers to deliver them. The new ICBM force grew from 63 intercontinental ballistic missiles to 424. He authorized 23 new Polaris submarines, each of which carried 16 nuclear missiles. He called on cities to prepare fallout shelters for nuclear war. In contrast to Eisenhower's warning about the perils of the military–industrial complex, Kennedy focused on arms buildup.

Competition in the Third World

Nationalist movements in some countries and regions, notably Guatemala, Indonesia and Indochina, were often allied with communist groups or otherwise perceived to be unfriendly to Western interests. In this context, the United States and the Soviet Union increasingly competed for influence by proxy in the Third World as decolonization gained momentum in the 1950s and early 1960s. Both sides were selling armaments to gain influence. The Kremlin saw continuing territorial losses by imperial powers as presaging the eventual victory of their ideology.

The United States used the Central Intelligence Agency (CIA) to undermine neutral or hostile Third World governments and to support allied ones. In 1953, President Eisenhower implemented Operation Ajax, a covert coup operation to overthrow the Iranian prime minister, Mohammad Mosaddegh. The popularly elected Mosaddegh had been a Middle Eastern nemesis of Britain since nationalizing the British-owned Anglo-Iranian Oil Company in 1951. Winston Churchill told the United States that Mosaddegh was "increasingly turning towards Communist influence." The pro-Western shah, Mohammad Reza Pahlavi, assumed control as an autocratic monarch. The shah's policies included banning the communist Tudeh Party of Iran, and general suppression of political dissent by SAVAK, the shah's domestic security and intelligence agency.

In Guatemala, a banana republic, the 1954 Guatemalan coup d'état ousted the left-wing President Jacobo Árbenz with material CIA support. The post-Arbenz government—a military junta headed by Carlos Castillo Armas—repealed a progressive land reform law, returned nationalized property belonging to the United Fruit Company, set up a National Committee of Defense Against Communism, and decreed a Preventive Penal Law Against Communism at the request of the United States.

The non-aligned Indonesian government of Sukarno was faced with a major threat to its legitimacy beginning in 1956 when several regional commanders began to demand autonomy from Jakarta. After mediation failed, Sukarno took action to remove the dissident commanders. In February 1958, dissident military commanders in Central Sumatra (Colonel Ahmad Husein) and North Sulawesi (Colonel Ventje Sumual) declared the Revolutionary Government of the Republic of Indonesia-Permesta Movement aimed at overthrowing the Sukarno regime. They were joined by many civilian politicians from the Masyumi Party, such as Sjafruddin Prawiranegara, who were opposed to the growing influence of the communist Partai Komunis Indonesia. Due to their anti-communist rhetoric, the rebels received arms, funding, and other covert aid from the CIA until Allen Lawrence Pope, an American pilot, was shot down after a bombing raid on government-held Ambon in April 1958. The central government responded by launching airborne and seaborne military invasions of rebel strongholds at Padang and Manado. By the end of 1958, the rebels were militarily defeated, and the last remaining rebel guerilla bands surrendered by August 1961.

In the Republic of the Congo, newly independent from Belgium since June 1960, the Congo Crisis erupted on 5 July leading to the secession of the regions Katanga and South Kasai. CIA-backed President Joseph Kasa-Vubu ordered the dismissal of the democratically elected Prime Minister Patrice Lumumba and the Lumumba cabinet in September over massacres by the armed forces during the invasion of South Kasai and for involving Soviets in the country. Later the CIA-backed Colonel Mobutu Sese Seko quickly mobilized his forces to seize power through a military coup d'état,  and worked with Western intelligence agencies to imprison Lumumba and hand him over to Katangan authorities who executed him by firing squad.

In British Guiana, the leftist People's Progressive Party (PPP) candidate Cheddi Jagan won the position of chief minister in a colonially administered election in 1953 but was quickly forced to resign from power after Britain's suspension of the still-dependent nation's constitution. Embarrassed by the landslide electoral victory of Jagan's allegedly Marxist party, the British imprisoned the PPP's leadership and maneuvered the organization into a divisive rupture in 1955, engineering a split between Jagan and his PPP colleagues. Jagan again won the colonial elections in 1957 and 1961, despite Britain's shift to a reconsideration of its view of the left-wing Jagan as a Soviet-style communist at this time. The United States pressured the British to withhold Guyana's independence until an alternative to Jagan could be identified, supported, and brought into office.

Worn down by the communist guerrilla war for Vietnamese independence and handed a watershed defeat by communist Viet Minh rebels at the 1954 Battle of Dien Bien Phu, the French accepted a negotiated abandonment of their colonial stake in Vietnam. In the Geneva Conference, peace accords were signed, leaving Vietnam divided between a pro-Soviet administration in North Vietnam and a pro-Western administration in South Vietnam at the 17th parallel north. Between 1954 and 1961, Eisenhower's United States sent economic aid and military advisers to strengthen South Vietnam's pro-Western regime against communist efforts to destabilize it.

Many emerging nations of Asia, Africa, and Latin America rejected the pressure to choose sides in the East–West competition. In 1955, at the Bandung Conference in Indonesia, dozens of Third World governments resolved to stay out of the Cold War. The consensus reached at Bandung culminated with the creation of the Belgrade-headquartered Non-Aligned Movement in 1961. Meanwhile, Khrushchev broadened Moscow's policy to establish ties with India and other key neutral states. Independence movements in the Third World transformed the post-war order into a more pluralistic world of decolonized African and Middle Eastern nations and of rising nationalism in Asia and Latin America.

Sino-Soviet split

After 1956, the Sino-Soviet alliance began to break down. Mao had defended Stalin when Khrushchev criticized him in 1956, and treated the new Soviet leader as a superficial upstart, accusing him of having lost his revolutionary edge. For his part, Khrushchev, disturbed by Mao's glib attitude toward nuclear war, referred to the Chinese leader as a "lunatic on a throne".

After this, Khrushchev made many desperate attempts to reconstitute the Sino-Soviet alliance, but Mao considered it useless and denied any proposal. The Chinese-Soviet animosity spilled out in an intra-communist propaganda war. Further on, the Soviets focused on a bitter rivalry with Mao's China for leadership of the global communist movement. Historian Lorenz M. Lüthi argues:
The Sino-Soviet split was one of the key events of the Cold War, equal in importance to the construction of the Berlin Wall, the Cuban Missile Crisis, the Second Vietnam War, and Sino-American rapprochement. The split helped to determine the framework of the Second Cold War in general, and influenced the course of the Second Vietnam War in particular.

Space Race

On the nuclear weapons front, the United States and the USSR pursued nuclear rearmament and developed long-range weapons with which they could strike the territory of the other. In August 1957, the Soviets successfully launched the world's first intercontinental ballistic missile (ICBM), and in October they launched the first Earth satellite, Sputnik 1. The launch of Sputnik inaugurated the Space Race. This led to the Apollo Moon landings by the United States, which astronaut Frank Borman later described as "just a battle in the Cold War." A major Cold War element of the Space Race was satellite reconnaissance, as well as signals intelligence to gauge which aspects of the space programs had military capabilities.

Later, however, the US and USSR pursued some cooperation in space as part of détente, such as Apollo–Soyuz.

Aftermath of the Cuban Revolution

In Cuba, the 26th of July Movement, led by young revolutionaries Fidel Castro and Che Guevara, seized power in the Cuban Revolution on 1 January 1959, toppling President Fulgencio Batista, whose unpopular regime had been denied arms by the Eisenhower administration. Although Fidel Castro's first refused to categorize his new government as socialist and repeatedly denying being a communist, Castro appointed Marxists to senior government and military positions. Most significantly, Che Guevara became Governor of the Central Bank and then Minister of Industries.

Diplomatic relations between Cuba and the United States continued for some time after Batista's fall, but President Eisenhower deliberately left the capital to avoid meeting Castro during the latter's trip to Washington, D.C. in April, leaving Vice President Richard Nixon to conduct the meeting in his place. Cuba began negotiating for arms purchases from the Eastern Bloc in March 1960. In March of that year Eisenhower gave approval to CIA plans and funding to overthrow Castro.

In January 1961, just prior to leaving office, Eisenhower formally severed relations with the Cuban government. That April, the administration of newly elected American President John F. Kennedy mounted the unsuccessful CIA-organized ship-borne invasion of the island at Playa Girón and Playa Larga in Santa Clara Province—a failure that publicly humiliated the United States. Castro responded by publicly embracing Marxism–Leninism, and the Soviet Union pledged to provide further support. In December, the US government began a campaign of terrorist attacks against the Cuban people and covert operations and sabotage against the administration, in an attempt to overthrow the Cuban government.

Berlin Crisis of 1961

The Berlin Crisis of 1961 was the last major incident in the Cold War regarding the status of Berlin and post–World War II Germany. By the early 1950s, the Soviet approach to restricting emigration movement was emulated by most of the rest of the Eastern Bloc. However, hundreds of thousands of East Germans annually emigrated to West Germany through a "loophole" in the system that existed between East Berlin and West Berlin, where the four occupying World War II powers governed movement.

The emigration resulted in a massive "brain drain" from East Germany to West Germany of younger educated professionals, such that nearly 20% of East Germany's population had migrated to West Germany by 1961. That June, the Soviet Union issued a new ultimatum demanding the withdrawal of Allied forces from West Berlin. The request was rebuffed, but the United States now limited its security guarantees to West Berlin. On 13 August, East Germany erected a barbed-wire barrier that would eventually be expanded through construction into the Berlin Wall, effectively closing the loophole.

Cuban Missile Crisis and Khrushchev's ousting

The Kennedy administration continued seeking ways to oust Castro following the Bay of Pigs Invasion, experimenting with various ways of covertly facilitating the overthrow of the Cuban government. Significant hopes were pinned on the program of terrorist attacks and other destabilisation operations known as Operation Mongoose, devised under the Kennedy administration in 1961. Khrushchev learned of the project in February 1962, and preparations to install Soviet nuclear missiles in Cuba were undertaken in response.

Alarmed, Kennedy considered various reactions. He ultimately responded to the installation of nuclear missiles in Cuba with a naval blockade, and he presented an ultimatum to the Soviets. Khrushchev backed down from a confrontation, and the Soviet Union removed the missiles in return for a public American pledge not to invade Cuba again as well as a covert deal to remove US missiles from Turkey. Castro later admitted that "I would have agreed to the use of nuclear weapons. ... we took it for granted that it would become a nuclear war anyway, and that we were going to disappear."

The Cuban Missile Crisis (October–November 1962) brought the world closer to nuclear war than ever before. The aftermath of the crisis led to the first efforts in the nuclear arms race at nuclear disarmament and improving relations, although the Cold War's first arms control agreement, the Antarctic Treaty, had come into force in 1961.

In 1964, Khrushchev's Kremlin colleagues managed to oust him, but allowed him a peaceful retirement. Accused of rudeness and incompetence, John Lewis Gaddis argues that Khrushchev was also credited with ruining Soviet agriculture, bringing the world to the brink of nuclear war and that Khrushchev had become an 'international embarrassment' when he authorized construction of the Berlin Wall.

From confrontation to détente (1962–1979)

In the course of the 1960s and 1970s, Cold War participants struggled to adjust to a new, more complicated pattern of international relations in which the world was no longer divided into two clearly opposed blocs. From the beginning of the post-war period, Western Europe and Japan rapidly recovered from the destruction of World War II and sustained strong economic growth through the 1950s and 1960s, with per capita GDPs approaching those of the United States, while Eastern Bloc economies stagnated.

The Vietnam War descended into a quagmire for the United States, leading to a decline in international prestige and economic stability, derailing arms agreements, and provoking domestic unrest. America's withdrawal from the war led it to embrace a policy of détente with both China and the Soviet Union.

In the 1973 oil crisis, Organization of Petroleum Exporting Countries (OPEC) cut their petroleum output. This raised oil prices and hurt Western economies, but helped the Soviet Union by generating a huge flow of money from its oil sales.

As a result of the oil crisis, combined with the growing influence of Third World alignments such as OPEC and the Non-Aligned Movement, less powerful countries had more room to assert their independence and often showed themselves resistant to pressure from either superpower. Meanwhile, Moscow was forced to turn its attention inward to deal with the Soviet Union's deep-seated domestic economic problems. During this period, Soviet leaders such as Leonid Brezhnev and Alexei Kosygin embraced the notion of détente.

Vietnam War

Under President John F. Kennedy, US troop levels in Vietnam grew under the Military Assistance Advisory Group program from just under a thousand in 1959 to 16,000 in 1963. South Vietnamese President Ngo Dinh Diem's heavy-handed crackdown on Buddhist monks in 1963 led the US to endorse a deadly military coup against Diem. The war escalated further in 1964 following the controversial Gulf of Tonkin incident, in which a US destroyer was alleged to have clashed with North Vietnamese fast attack craft. The Gulf of Tonkin Resolution gave President Lyndon B. Johnson broad authorization to increase US military presence, deploying ground combat units for the first time and increasing troop levels to 184,000. Soviet leader Leonid Brezhnev responded by reversing Khrushchev's policy of disengagement and increasing aid to the North Vietnamese, hoping to entice the North from its pro-Chinese position. The USSR discouraged further escalation of the war, however, providing just enough military assistance to tie up American forces. From this point, the People's Army of Vietnam (PAVN), also known as the North Vietnamese Army (NVA) engaged in more conventional warfare with US and South Vietnamese forces.

The Tet Offensive of 1968 proved to be the turning point of the war. Despite years of American tutelage and aid the South Vietnamese forces were unable to withstand the communist offensive and the task fell to US forces instead. Tet showed that the end of US involvement was not in sight, increasing domestic skepticism of the war and giving rise to what was referred to as the Vietnam Syndrome, a public aversion to American overseas military involvements. Nonetheless, operations continued to cross international boundaries: bordering areas of Laos and Cambodia were used by North Vietnam as supply routes, and were heavily bombed by US forces.

At the same time, 1963–1965, American domestic politics saw the triumph of liberalism. According to historian Joseph Crespino:
It has become a staple of twentieth-century historiography that Cold War concerns were at the root of a number of progressive political accomplishments in the postwar period: a high progressive marginal tax rate that helped fund the arms race and contributed to broad income equality; bipartisan support for far-reaching civil rights legislation that transformed politics and society in the American South, which had long given the lie to America's egalitarian ethos; bipartisan support for overturning an explicitly racist immigration system that had been in place since the 1920s; and free health care for the elderly and the poor, a partial fulfillment of one of the unaccomplished goals of the New Deal era. The list could go on.

French withdrawal from NATO military structures

The unity of NATO was breached early in its history, with a crisis occurring during Charles de Gaulle's presidency of France. De Gaulle protested at the strong role of the United States in the organization and what he perceived as a special relationship between the United States and the United Kingdom. In a memorandum sent to President Dwight D. Eisenhower and Prime Minister Harold Macmillan on 17 September 1958, he argued for the creation of a tripartite directorate that would put France on an equal footing with the United States and the United Kingdom, and also for the expansion of NATO's coverage to include geographical areas of interest to France, most notably French Algeria, where France was waging a counter-insurgency and sought NATO assistance. De Gaulle considered the response he received to be unsatisfactory and began the development of an independent French nuclear deterrent. In 1966 he withdrew France from NATO's military structures and expelled NATO troops from French soil.

Finlandization

Officially claiming to be neutral, Finland lay in the grey zone between the Western countries and the Soviet Union. The YYA Treaty (Finno-Soviet Pact of Friendship, Cooperation, and Mutual Assistance) gave the Soviet Union some leverage in Finnish domestic politics, which was later used as the term "Finlandization" by the West German press, meaning "to become like Finland". This meant, among other things, the Soviet adaptation spread to the editors of mass media, sparking strong forms of self-control, self-censorship (which included the banning of anti-Soviet books) and pro-Soviet attitudes. Most of the elite of media and politics shifted their attitudes to match the values that the Soviets were thought to favor and approve. Only after the ascent of Mikhail Gorbachev to Soviet leadership in 1985 did mass media in Finland gradually begin to criticise the Soviet Union more. When the Soviet Union allowed non-communist governments to take power in Eastern Europe, Gorbachev suggested they could look to Finland as an example to follow.

For West German conservative politicians, especially the Bavarian Prime Minister Franz Josef Strauss, the case of Finlandization served as a warning, for example, about how a great power dictates its much smaller neighbor in its internal affairs and the neighbor's independence becomes formal. During the Cold War, Finlandization was seen not only in Bavaria but also in Western intelligence services as a threat that completely free states had to be warned about in advance. To combat Finlandization, propaganda books and newspaper articles were published through CIA-funded research institutes and media companies, which denigrated Finnish neutrality policy and President Urho Kekkonen; this was one factor in making room for the East-West espionage on Finnish soil between the two great powers.

However, Finland maintained capitalism unlike most other countries bordering the Soviet Union. Even though being a neighbor to the Soviet Union sometimes resulted in overcautious concern in foreign policy, Finland developed closer co-operation with the other Nordic countries and declared itself even more neutral in superpower politics, although in the later years, support for capitalism was even more widespread.

Invasion of Czechoslovakia

In 1968, a period of political liberalization took place in Czechoslovakia called the Prague Spring. An "Action Program" of reforms included increasing freedom of the press, freedom of speech and freedom of movement, along with an economic emphasis on consumer goods, the possibility of a multiparty government, limitations on the power of the secret police, and potential withdrawal from the Warsaw Pact.

In answer to the Prague Spring, on 20 August 1968, the Soviet Army, together with most of their Warsaw Pact allies, invaded Czechoslovakia. The invasion was followed by a wave of emigration, including an estimated 70,000 Czechs and Slovaks initially fleeing, with the total eventually reaching 300,000. The invasion sparked intense protests from Yugoslavia, Romania, China, and from Western European countries..

Brezhnev Doctrine

In September 1968, during a speech at the Fifth Congress of the Polish United Workers' Party one month after the invasion of Czechoslovakia, Brezhnev outlined the Brezhnev Doctrine, in which he claimed the right to violate the sovereignty of any country attempting to replace Marxism–Leninism with capitalism. During the speech, Brezhnev stated:

The doctrine found its origins in the failures of Marxism–Leninism in states like Poland, Hungary and East Germany, which were facing a declining standard of living contrasting with the prosperity of West Germany and the rest of Western Europe.

Third World escalations

Under the Lyndon B. Johnson administration, which gained power after the assassination of John F. Kennedy, the US took a more hardline stance on Latin America—sometimes called the "Mann Doctrine". In 1964, the Brazilian military overthrew the government of president João Goulart with US backing. In late April 1965, the US sent some 22,000 troops to the Dominican Republic in an intervention, codenamed Operation Power Pack, into the Dominican Civil War between supporters of deposed  president Juan Bosch and supporters of General Elías Wessin y Wessin, citing the threat of the emergence of a Cuban-style revolution in Latin America. The OAS also deployed soldiers to the conflict through the mostly Brazilian Inter-American Peace Force. Héctor García-Godoy acted as provisional president, until conservative former president Joaquín Balaguer won the 1966 presidential election against non-campaigning Juan Bosch. Activists for Bosch's Dominican Revolutionary Party were violently harassed by the Dominican police and armed forces.

In Indonesia, the hardline anti-communist General Suharto wrested control of the state from his predecessor Sukarno in an attempt to establish a "New Order". From 1965 to 1966, with the aid of the United States and other Western governments, the military led the mass killing of more than 500,000 members and sympathizers of the Indonesian Communist Party and other leftist organizations, and detained hundreds of thousands more in prison camps around the country under extremely inhumane conditions. A top-secret CIA report stated that the massacres "rank as one of the worst mass murders of the 20th century, along with the Soviet purges of the 1930s, the Nazi mass murders during the Second World War, and the Maoist bloodbath of the early 1950s." These killings served US strategic interests and constitute a major turning point in the Cold War as the balance of power shifted in Southeast Asia.

Escalating the scale of American intervention in the ongoing conflict between Ngô Đình Diệm's South Vietnamese government and the communist National Front for the Liberation of South Vietnam (NLF) insurgents opposing it, Johnson deployed some 575,000 troops in Southeast Asia to defeat the NLF and their North Vietnamese allies in the Vietnam War, but his costly policy weakened the US economy and, by 1975, it ultimately culminated in what most of the world saw as a humiliating defeat of the world's most powerful superpower at the hands of one of the world's poorest nations.

The Middle East remained a source of contention. Egypt, which received the bulk of its arms and economic assistance from the USSR, was a troublesome client, with a reluctant Soviet Union feeling obliged to assist in both the 1967 Six-Day War (with advisers and technicians) and the War of Attrition (with pilots and aircraft) against pro-Western Israel. Despite the beginning of an Egyptian shift from a pro-Soviet to a pro-American orientation in 1972 (under Egypt's new leader Anwar Sadat), rumors of imminent Soviet intervention on the Egyptians' behalf during the 1973 Yom Kippur War brought about a massive American mobilization that threatened to wreck détente.  Although pre-Sadat Egypt had been the largest recipient of Soviet aid in the Middle East, the Soviets were also successful in establishing close relations with communist South Yemen, as well as the nationalist governments of Algeria and Iraq. Iraq signed a 15-year Treaty of Friendship and Cooperation with the Soviet Union in 1972. According to historian Charles R. H. Tripp, the treaty upset "the US-sponsored security system established as part of the Cold War in the Middle East. It appeared that any enemy of the Baghdad regime was a potential ally of the United States." In response, the US covertly financed Kurdish rebels led by Mustafa Barzani during the Second Iraqi–Kurdish War; the Kurds were defeated in 1975, leading to the forcible relocation of hundreds of thousands of Kurdish civilians. Indirect Soviet assistance to the Palestinian side of the Israeli–Palestinian conflict included support for Yasser Arafat's Palestine Liberation Organization (PLO).

In East Africa, a territorial dispute between Somalia and Ethiopia over the Ogaden region resulted in the Ogaden War. Around June 1977, Somali troops occupied the Ogaden and began advancing inland towards Ethiopian positions in the Ahmar Mountains. Both countries were client states of the Soviet Union; Somalia was led by self-proclaimed Marxist military leader Siad Barre, and Ethiopia was controlled by the Derg, a cabal of military generals loyal to the pro-Soviet Mengistu Haile Mariam, who had declared the Provisional Military Government of Socialist Ethiopia in 1975. The Soviets initially attempted to exert a moderating influence on both states, but in November 1977 Barre broke off relations with Moscow and expelled his Soviet military advisers. He then turned to the China and Safari Club—a group of pro-American intelligence agencies including those of Iran, Egypt, Saudi Arabia—for support and weapons. While declining to take a direct part in hostilities, the Soviet Union did provide the impetus for a successful Ethiopian counteroffensive to expel Somalia from the Ogaden. The counteroffensive was planned at the command level by Soviet advisers attached to the Ethiopian general staff, and bolstered by the delivery of millions of dollars' of sophisticated Soviet arms. About 11,000 Cuban troops spearheaded the primary effort, after receiving a hasty training on some of the newly delivered Soviet weapons systems by East German instructors.

In Chile, the Socialist Party candidate Salvador Allende won the presidential election of 1970, thereby becoming the first democratically elected Marxist to become president of a country in the Americas. The CIA targeted Allende for removal and operated to undermine his support domestically, which contributed to a period of unrest culminating in General Augusto Pinochet's coup d'état on 11 September 1973. Pinochet consolidated power as a military dictator, Allende's reforms of the economy were rolled back, and leftist opponents were killed or detained in internment camps under the Dirección de Inteligencia Nacional (DINA). The Socialist states—with the exception of China and Romania—broke off relations with Chile. The Pinochet regime would go on to be one of the leading participants in Operation Condor, an international campaign of political assassination and state terrorism organized by right-wing military dictatorships in the Southern Cone of South America that was covertly supported by the US government.

On 24 April 1974, the Carnation Revolution succeeded in ousting Marcello Caetano and Portugal's right-wing Estado Novo government, sounding the death knell for the Portuguese Empire.
Independence was hastily granted to a number of Portuguese colonies, including Angola, where the disintegration of colonial rule was followed by a violent civil war.
There were three rival militant factions competing for power in Angola, the People's Movement for the Liberation of Angola (MPLA), the National Union for the Total Independence of Angola (UNITA), and the National Liberation Front of Angola (FNLA).
While all three had socialist leanings, the MPLA was the only party with close ties to the Soviet Union. Its adherence to the concept of a one-party state alienated it from the FNLA and UNITA, which began portraying themselves as anti-communist and pro-Western in orientation. When the Soviets began supplying the MPLA with arms, the CIA and China offered substantial covert aid to the FNLA and UNITA. The MPLA eventually requested direct military support from Moscow in the form of ground troops, but the Soviets declined, offering to send advisers but no combat personnel. Cuba was more forthcoming and began amassing troops in Angola to assist the MPLA. By November 1975 there were over a thousand Cuban soldiers in the country. The persistent buildup of Cuban troops and Soviet weapons allowed the MPLA to secure victory and blunt an abortive intervention by Zairean and South African troops, which had deployed in a belated attempt to assist the FNLA and UNITA.

During the Vietnam War, North Vietnam used border areas of Cambodia as military bases, which Cambodian head of state Norodom Sihanouk tolerated in an attempt to preserve Cambodia's neutrality. Following Sihanouk's March 1970 deposition by pro-American general Lon Nol, who ordered the North Vietnamese to leave Cambodia, North Vietnam attempted to overrun all of Cambodia following negotiations with Nuon Chea, the second-in-command of the Cambodian communists (dubbed the Khmer Rouge) fighting to overthrow the Cambodian government. Sihanouk fled to China with the establishment of the GRUNK in Beijing. American and South Vietnamese forces responded to these actions with a bombing campaign and a brief ground incursion, which contributed to the violence of the civil war that soon enveloped all of Cambodia. US carpet bombing lasted until 1973, and while it prevented the Khmer Rouge from seizing the capital, it also accelerated the collapse of rural society, increased social polarization, and killed tens of thousands of civilians.

After taking power and distancing himself from the Vietnamese, pro-China Khmer Rouge leader Pol Pot killed 1.5 to 2 million Cambodians in the killing fields, roughly a quarter of the Cambodian population (an event commonly labelled the Cambodian genocide). Martin Shaw described these atrocities as "the purest genocide of the Cold War era." Backed by the Kampuchean United Front for National Salvation, an organization of Khmer pro-Soviet Communists and Khmer Rouge defectors led by Heng Samrin, Vietnam invaded Cambodia on 22 December 1978. The invasion succeeded in deposing Pol Pot, but the new state would struggle to gain international recognition beyond the Soviet Bloc sphere. Despite the previous international outcry at the Pol Pot regime's gross human rights violations, representatives of the Khmer Rouge were allowed to be seated in the UN General Assembly, with strong support from China, Western powers, and the member countries of ASEAN. Cambodia would become bogged down in a guerrilla war led from refugee camps located on the border with Thailand. Following the destruction of the Khmer Rouge, the national reconstruction of Cambodia would be severely hampered, and Vietnam would suffer a punitive Chinese attack.

Sino-American rapprochement

As a result of the Sino-Soviet split, tensions along the Chinese–Soviet border reached their peak in 1969, and United States President Richard Nixon decided to use the conflict to shift the balance of power towards the West in the Cold War. The Chinese had sought improved relations with the Americans in order to gain an advantage over the Soviets as well.

In February 1972, Nixon achieved a stunning rapprochement with China, traveling to Beijing and meeting with Mao Zedong and Zhou Enlai. At this time, the USSR achieved rough nuclear parity with the United States; meanwhile, the Vietnam War both weakened America's influence in the Third World and cooled relations with Western Europe.

Although indirect conflict between Cold War powers continued through the late 1960s and early 1970s, tensions were beginning to ease.

Nixon, Brezhnev, and détente

Following his visit to China, Nixon met with Soviet leaders, including Brezhnev in Moscow. These Strategic Arms Limitation Talks resulted in two landmark arms control treaties: SALT I, the first comprehensive limitation pact signed by the two superpowers, and the Anti-Ballistic Missile Treaty, which banned the development of systems designed to intercept incoming missiles. These aimed to limit the development of costly anti-ballistic missiles and nuclear missiles.

Nixon and Brezhnev proclaimed a new era of "peaceful coexistence" and established the groundbreaking new policy of détente (or cooperation) between the two superpowers. Meanwhile, Brezhnev attempted to revive the Soviet economy, which was declining in part because of heavy military expenditures. Between 1972 and 1974, the two sides also agreed to strengthen their economic ties, including agreements for increased trade. As a result of their meetings, détente would replace the hostility of the Cold War and the two countries would live mutually. These developments coincided with Bonn's "Ostpolitik" policy formulated by the West German Chancellor Willy Brandt, an effort to normalize relations between West Germany and Eastern Europe. Other agreements were concluded to stabilize the situation in Europe, culminating in the Helsinki Accords signed at the Conference on Security and Co-operation in Europe in 1975.

Kissinger and Nixon were "realists" who deemphasized idealistic goals like anti-communism or promotion of democracy worldwide because those goals were too expensive in terms of America's economic capabilities. Instead of a Cold War they wanted peace, trade and cultural exchanges. They realized that Americans were no longer willing to tax themselves for idealistic foreign policy goals, especially for containment policies that never seemed to produce positive results. Instead, Nixon and Kissinger sought to downsize America's global commitments in proportion to its reduced economic, moral and political power. They rejected "idealism" as impractical and too expensive, and neither man showed much sensitivity to the plight of people living under Communism. Kissinger's realism fell out of fashion as idealism returned to American foreign policy with Carter's moralism emphasizing human rights, and Reagan's rollback strategy aimed at destroying Communism.

Late 1970s deterioration of relations
In the 1970s, the KGB, led by Yuri Andropov, continued to persecute distinguished Soviet personalities such as Aleksandr Solzhenitsyn and Andrei Sakharov, who were criticising the Soviet leadership in harsh terms. Indirect conflict between the superpowers continued through this period of détente in the Third World, particularly during political crises in the Middle East, Chile, Ethiopia, and Angola.

Although President Jimmy Carter tried to place another limit on the arms race with a SALT II agreement in 1979, his efforts were undermined by the other events that year, including the Iranian Revolution and the Nicaraguan Revolution, which both ousted pro-US regimes, and his retaliation against Soviet intervention in Afghanistan in December.

New Cold War (1979–1985)

The term new Cold War refers to the period of intensive reawakening of Cold War tensions and conflicts in the late 1970s and early 1980s. Tensions greatly increased between the major powers with both sides becoming more militant. Diggins says, "Reagan went all out to fight the second cold war, by supporting counterinsurgencies in the third world." Cox says, "The intensity of this 'second' Cold War was as great as its duration was short."

Soviet–Afghan War

In April 1978, the communist People's Democratic Party of Afghanistan (PDPA) seized power in Afghanistan in the Saur Revolution. Within months, opponents of the communist government launched an uprising in eastern Afghanistan that quickly expanded into a civil war waged by guerrilla mujahideen against government forces countrywide. The Islamic Unity of Afghanistan Mujahideen insurgents received military training and weapons in neighboring Pakistan and China, while the Soviet Union sent thousands of military advisers to support the PDPA government. Meanwhile, increasing friction between the competing factions of the PDPA—the dominant Khalq and the more moderate Parcham—resulted in the dismissal of Parchami cabinet members and the arrest of Parchami military officers under the pretext of a Parchami coup. By mid-1979, the United States had started a covert program to assist the mujahideen.

In September 1979, Khalqist President Nur Muhammad Taraki was assassinated in a coup within the PDPA orchestrated by fellow Khalq member Hafizullah Amin, who assumed the presidency. Distrusted by the Soviets, Amin was assassinated by Soviet special forces during Operation Storm-333 in December 1979. A Soviet-organized government, led by Parcham's Babrak Karmal but inclusive of anti-Amin Khalqis, filled the vacuum and carried out a purge of Amin supporters. Soviet troops were deployed to stabilize Afghanistan under Karmal in more substantial numbers, although the Soviet government did not expect to do most of the fighting in Afghanistan. As a result, however, the Soviets were now directly involved in what had been a domestic war in Afghanistan.

Carter responded to the Soviet intervention by withdrawing the SALT II treaty from ratification, imposing embargoes on grain and technology shipments to the USSR, and demanding a significant increase in military spending, and further announced that the United States would boycott the 1980 Summer Olympics in Moscow. He described the Soviet incursion as "the most serious threat to the peace since the Second World War".

Reagan and Thatcher

In January 1977, four years prior to becoming president, Ronald Reagan bluntly stated, in a conversation with Richard V. Allen, his basic expectation in relation to the Cold War. "My idea of American policy toward the Soviet Union is simple, and some would say simplistic," he said. "It is this: We win and they lose. What do you think of that?" In 1980, Ronald Reagan defeated Jimmy Carter in the 1980 presidential election, vowing to increase military spending and confront the Soviets everywhere. Both Reagan and new British Prime Minister Margaret Thatcher denounced the Soviet Union and its ideology. Reagan labeled the Soviet Union an "evil empire" and predicted that Communism would be left on the "ash heap of history," while Thatcher inculpated the Soviets as "bent on world dominance." In 1982, Reagan tried to cut off Moscow's access to hard currency by impeding its proposed gas line to Western Europe. It hurt the Soviet economy, but it also caused ill will among American allies in Europe who counted on that revenue. Reagan retreated on this issue.

By early 1985, Reagan's anti-communist position had developed into a stance known as the new Reagan Doctrine—which, in addition to containment, formulated an additional right to subvert existing communist governments. Besides continuing Carter's policy of supporting the Islamic opponents of the Soviet Union and the Soviet-backed PDPA government in Afghanistan, the CIA also sought to weaken the Soviet Union itself by promoting Islamism in the majority-Muslim Central Asian Soviet Union. Additionally, the CIA encouraged anti-communist Pakistan's ISI to train Muslims from around the world to participate in the jihad against the Soviet Union.

Polish Solidarity movement and martial law

Pope John Paul II provided a moral focus for anti-communism; a visit to his native Poland in 1979 stimulated a religious and nationalist resurgence centered on the Solidarity movement that galvanized opposition and may have led to his attempted assassination two years later.
In December 1981, Poland's Wojciech Jaruzelski reacted to the crisis by imposing a period of martial law. Reagan imposed economic sanctions on Poland in response. Mikhail Suslov, the Kremlin's top ideologist, advised Soviet leaders not to intervene if Poland fell under the control of Solidarity, for fear it might lead to heavy economic sanctions, resulting in a catastrophe for the Soviet economy.

US and USSR military and economic issues

The Soviet Union had built up a military that consumed as much as 25 percent of its gross national product at the expense of consumer goods and investment in civilian sectors. Soviet spending on the arms race and other Cold War commitments both caused and exacerbated deep-seated structural problems in the Soviet system, which experienced at least a decade of economic stagnation during the late Brezhnev years.

Soviet investment in the defense sector was not driven by military necessity but in large part by the interests of the nomenklatura, which was dependent on the sector for their own power and privileges. The Soviet Armed Forces became the largest in the world in terms of the numbers and types of weapons they possessed, in the number of troops in their ranks, and in the sheer size of their military–industrial base. However, the quantitative advantages held by the Soviet military often concealed areas where the Eastern Bloc dramatically lagged behind the West. For example, the Persian Gulf War demonstrated how the armor, fire control systems, and firing range of the Soviet Union's most common main battle tank, the T-72, were drastically inferior to the American M1 Abrams, yet the USSR fielded almost three times as many T-72s as the US deployed M1s.

By the early 1980s, the USSR had built up a military arsenal and army surpassing that of the United States. Soon after the Soviet invasion of Afghanistan, president Carter began massively building up the United States military. This buildup was accelerated by the Reagan administration, which increased the military spending from 5.3 percent of GNP in 1981 to 6.5 percent in 1986, the largest peacetime defense buildup in United States history. The American-Soviet tensions present during 1983 was defined by some as the start of "Cold War II". Whilst in retrospective this phase of the Cold War was generally defined as a "war of words", the Soviet's "peace offensive" was largely rejected by the West.

Tensions continued to intensify as Reagan revived the B-1 Lancer program, which had been canceled by the Carter administration, produced LGM-118 Peacekeeper missiles, installed US cruise missiles in Europe, and announced the experimental Strategic Defense Initiative, dubbed "Star Wars" by the media, a defense program to shoot down missiles in mid-flight. The Soviets deployed RSD-10 Pioneer ballistic missiles targeting Western Europe, and NATO decided, under the impetus of the Carter presidency, to deploy MGM-31 Pershing and cruise missiles in Europe, primarily West Germany. This deployment placed missiles just 10 minutes' striking distance from Moscow.

After Reagan's military buildup, the Soviet Union did not respond by further building its military, because the enormous military expenses, along with inefficient planned manufacturing and collectivized agriculture, were already a heavy burden for the Soviet economy. At the same time, Saudi Arabia increased oil production, even as other non-OPEC nations were increasing production. These developments contributed to the 1980s oil glut, which affected the Soviet Union as oil was the main source of Soviet export revenues. Issues with command economics, oil price decreases and large military expenditures gradually brought the Soviet economy to stagnation.

On 1 September 1983, the Soviet Union shot down Korean Air Lines Flight 007, a Boeing 747 with 269 people aboard, including sitting Congressman Larry McDonald, an action which Reagan characterized as a "massacre". The airliner had violated Soviet airspace just past the west coast of Sakhalin Island near Moneron Island, and the Soviets treated the unidentified aircraft as an intruding US spy plane. The incident increased support for military deployment, overseen by Reagan, which stood in place until the later accords between Reagan and Mikhail Gorbachev. During the early hours of September 26, 1983, the 1983 Soviet nuclear false alarm incident occurred; systems in Serpukhov-15 underwent a glitch that claimed several intercontinental ballistic missiles were heading towards Russia, but officer Stanislav Petrov correctly suspected it was a false alarm, ensuring the Soviets did not respond to the non-existent attack. As such, he has been credited as "the man who saved the world". The Able Archer 83 exercise in November 1983, a realistic simulation of a coordinated NATO nuclear release, was perhaps the most dangerous moment since the Cuban Missile Crisis, as the Soviet leadership feared that a nuclear attack might be imminent.

American domestic public concerns about intervening in foreign conflicts persisted from the end of the Vietnam War. The Reagan administration emphasized the use of quick, low-cost counterinsurgency tactics to intervene in foreign conflicts. In 1983, the Reagan administration intervened in the multisided Lebanese Civil War, invaded Grenada, bombed Libya and backed the Central American Contras, anti-communist paramilitaries seeking to overthrow the Soviet-aligned Sandinista government in Nicaragua. While Reagan's interventions against Grenada and Libya were popular in the United States, his backing of the Contra rebels was mired in controversy. The Reagan administration's backing of the military government of Guatemala during the Guatemalan Civil War, in particular the regime of Efraín Ríos Montt, was also controversial.

Meanwhile, the Soviets incurred high costs for their own foreign interventions. Although Brezhnev was convinced in 1979 that the Soviet war in Afghanistan would be brief, Muslim guerrillas, aided by the US, China, Britain, Saudi Arabia and Pakistan, waged a fierce resistance against the invasion. The Kremlin sent nearly 100,000 troops to support its puppet regime in Afghanistan, leading many outside observers to dub the war "the Soviets' Vietnam". However, Moscow's quagmire in Afghanistan was far more disastrous for the Soviets than Vietnam had been for the Americans because the conflict coincided with a period of internal decay and domestic crisis in the Soviet system.

A senior US State Department official predicted such an outcome as early as 1980, positing that the invasion resulted in part from a "domestic crisis within the Soviet  may be that the thermodynamic law of entropy  up with the Soviet system, which now seems to expend more energy on simply maintaining its equilibrium than on improving itself. We could be seeing a period of foreign movement at a time of internal decay".

Final years (1985–1991)

Gorbachev's reforms

By the time the comparatively youthful Mikhail Gorbachev became General Secretary in 1985, the Soviet economy was stagnant and faced a sharp fall in foreign currency earnings as a result of the downward slide in oil prices in the 1980s. These issues prompted Gorbachev to investigate measures to revive the ailing state.

An ineffectual start led to the conclusion that deeper structural changes were necessary, and in June 1987 Gorbachev announced an agenda of economic reform called perestroika, or restructuring. Perestroika relaxed the production quota system, allowed private ownership of businesses and paved the way for foreign investment. These measures were intended to redirect the country's resources from costly Cold War military commitments to more productive areas in the civilian sector.

Despite initial skepticism in the West, the new Soviet leader proved to be committed to reversing the Soviet Union's deteriorating economic condition instead of continuing the arms race with the West. Partly as a way to fight off internal opposition from party cliques to his reforms, Gorbachev simultaneously introduced glasnost, or openness, which increased freedom of the press and the transparency of state institutions. Glasnost was intended to reduce the corruption at the top of the Communist Party and moderate the abuse of power in the Central Committee. Glasnost also enabled increased contact between Soviet citizens and the western world, particularly with the United States, contributing to the accelerating détente between the two nations.

Thaw in relations

In response to the Kremlin's military and political concessions, Reagan agreed to renew talks on economic issues and the scaling-back of the arms race. The first summit was held in November 1985 in Geneva, Switzerland. At one stage the two men, accompanied only by an interpreter, agreed in principle to reduce each country's nuclear arsenal by 50 percent. A second summit was held in October 1986 in Reykjavík, Iceland. Talks went well until the focus shifted to Reagan's proposed Strategic Defense Initiative (SDI), which Gorbachev wanted to be eliminated. Reagan refused. The negotiations failed, but the third summit (Washington Summit (1987), December 8–10, 1987) led to a breakthrough with the signing of the Intermediate-Range Nuclear Forces Treaty (INF).

During 1988 it became apparent to the Soviets that oil and gas subsidies, along with the cost of maintaining massive troops levels, represented a substantial economic drain. In addition, the security advantage of a buffer zone was recognised as irrelevant and the Soviets officially declared that they would no longer intervene in the affairs of allied states in Central and Eastern Europe. 
Bush and Gorbachev met at the Moscow Summit May 29–June 3, 1988 and the Governors Island Summit December 7, 1988.

In 1989, Soviet forces withdrew from Afghanistan. In 1989, the Berlin Wall, the Inner German border and the Iron Curtain fell. 

On 3 December 1989, Gorbachev and Bush declared the Cold War over at the Malta Summit.

In February 1990, Gorbachev drafted the Treaty on the Final Settlement with Respect to Germany and signed it on 12 September 1990, allowing German reunification.  When the Berlin Wall came down, Gorbachev's "Common European Home" concept began to take shape.

 The two former rivals were partners in the Gulf War against Iraq (August 1990 – February 1991).

During the final summit in Moscow in July 1991, Gorbachev and George H. W. Bush signed the START I arms control treaty.

Eastern Europe breaks away

By 1989, the Soviet alliance system was on the brink of collapse, and, deprived of Soviet military support, the communist leaders of the Warsaw Pact states were losing power. Grassroots organizations, such as Poland's Solidarity movement, rapidly gained ground with strong popular bases.

The Pan-European Picnic in August 1989 in Hungary finally started a peaceful movement that the rulers in the Eastern Bloc could not stop. It was the largest movement of refugees from East Germany since the Berlin Wall was built in 1961 and ultimately brought about the fall of the Iron Curtain. The patrons of the picnic, Otto von Habsburg and the Hungarian Minister of State Imre Pozsgay, saw the planned event as an opportunity to test Mikhail Gorbachev's reaction. The Austrian branch of the Paneuropean Union, which was then headed by Karl von Habsburg, distributed thousands of brochures inviting the GDR holidaymakers in Hungary to a picnic near the border at Sopron. But with the mass exodus at the Pan-European Picnic the subsequent hesitant behavior of the Socialist Unity Party of East Germany and the non-interference of the Soviet Union broke the dams. Now tens of thousands of media-informed East Germans made their way to Hungary, which was no longer willing to keep its borders completely closed or to oblige its border troops to use armed force. On the one hand, this caused disagreement among the Eastern European states and, on the other hand, it was clear to the Eastern European population that the governments no longer had absolute power.

In 1989, the communist governments in Poland and Hungary became the first to negotiate the organization of competitive elections. In Czechoslovakia and East Germany, mass protests unseated entrenched communist leaders. The communist regimes in Bulgaria and Romania also crumbled, in the latter case as the result of a violent uprising. Attitudes had changed enough that US Secretary of State James Baker suggested that the American government would not be opposed to Soviet intervention in Romania, on behalf of the opposition, to prevent bloodshed.

The tidal wave of change culminated with the fall of the Berlin Wall in November 1989, which symbolized the collapse of European communist governments and graphically ended the Iron Curtain divide of Europe. The 1989 revolutionary wave swept across Central and Eastern Europe and peacefully overthrew all of the Soviet-style Marxist–Leninist states: East Germany, Poland, Hungary, Czechoslovakia and Bulgaria; Romania was the only Eastern-bloc country to topple its communist regime violently and execute its head of state.

Soviet dissolution

In the USSR itself, glasnost weakened the ideological bonds that held the Soviet Union together, and by February 1990, with the dissolution of the USSR looming, the Communist Party was forced to surrender its 73-year-old monopoly on state power. At the same time the union's component republics declared their autonomy from Moscow, with the Baltic states withdrawing from the union entirely.

Gorbachev used force to keep the Baltics from breaking away. The USSR was fatally weakened by a failed coup in August 1991. A growing number of Soviet republics, particularly Russia, threatened to secede from the USSR. The Commonwealth of Independent States, created on 21 December 1991, was a successor entity to the Soviet Union. The USSR was declared officially dissolved on 26 December 1991.

US President George H. W. Bush expressed his emotions: "The biggest thing that has happened in the world in my life, in our lives, is this: By the grace of God, America won the Cold War."

Aftermath

After the dissolution of the Soviet Union, Russia drastically cut military spending, and restructuring the economy left millions unemployed. The capitalist reforms culminated in a recession in the early 1990s more severe than the Great Depression as experienced by the United States and Germany. In the 25 years following the end of the Cold War, only five or six of the post-socialist states are on a path to joining the rich and capitalist world while most are falling behind, some to such an extent that it will take several decades to catch up to where they were before the collapse of communism.

Communist parties outside the Baltic states were not outlawed and their members were not prosecuted. Just a few places attempted to exclude even members of communist secret services from decision-making. In some countries, the communist party changed its name and continued to function.

Stephen Holmes of the University of Chicago argued in 1996 that decommunization, after a brief active period, quickly ended in near-universal failure. After the introduction of lustration, demand for scapegoats has become relatively low, and former communists have been elected for high governmental and other administrative positions. Holmes notes that the only real exception was former East Germany, where thousands of former Stasi informers have been fired from public positions.

Holmes suggests the following reasons for the failure of decommunization:
After 45–70 years of communist rule, nearly every family has members associated with the state. After the initial desire "to root out the reds" came a realization that massive punishment is wrong and finding only some guilty is hardly justice.
The urgency of the current economic problems of postcommunism makes the crimes of the communist past "old news" for many citizens.
Decommunization is believed to be a power game of elites.
The difficulty of dislodging the social elite makes it require a totalitarian state to disenfranchise the "enemies of the people" quickly and efficiently and a desire for normalcy overcomes the desire for punitive justice.
Very few people have a perfectly clean slate and so are available to fill the positions that require significant expertise.

The Cold War continues to influence world affairs. The post-Cold War world is considered to be unipolar, with the United States the sole remaining superpower. The Cold War defined the political role of the United States after World War II—by 1989 the United States had military alliances with 50 countries, with 526,000 troops stationed abroad, with 326,000 in Europe (two-thirds of which were in West Germany) and 130,000 in Asia (mainly Japan and South Korea). The Cold War also marked the zenith of peacetime military–industrial complexes, especially in the United States, and large-scale military funding of science. These complexes, though their origins may be found as early as the 19th century, snowballed considerably during the Cold War.

Cumulative US military expenditures throughout the entire Cold War amounted to an estimated $8 trillion. Further nearly 100,000 Americans died in the Korean and Vietnam Wars. Although Soviet casualties are difficult to estimate, as a share of gross national product the financial cost for the Soviet Union was much higher than that incurred by the United States.

In addition to the loss of life by uniformed soldiers, millions died in the superpowers' proxy wars around the globe, most notably in eastern Asia. Most of the proxy wars and subsidies for local conflicts ended along with the Cold War; interstate wars, ethnic wars, revolutionary wars, as well as refugee and displaced persons crises have declined sharply in the post-Cold War years.

However, the aftermath of the Cold War is not considered to be concluded. Many of the economic and social tensions that were exploited to fuel Cold War competition in parts of the Third World remain acute. The breakdown of state control in a number of areas formerly ruled by communist governments produced new civil and ethnic conflicts, particularly in the former Yugoslavia. In Central and Eastern Europe, the end of the Cold War has ushered in an era of economic growth and an increase in the number of liberal democracies, while in other parts of the world, such as Afghanistan, independence was accompanied by state failure.

In popular culture

During the Cold War, the United States and the Soviet Union invested heavily in propaganda designed to influence people around the world, especially using motion pictures. The Cold War endures as a popular topic reflected extensively in entertainment media, and continuing to the present with numerous post-1991 Cold War-themed feature films, novels, television, and other media. In 2013, a KGB-sleeper-agents-living-next-door action drama series, The Americans, set in the early 1980s, was ranked No. 6 on the Metacritic annual Best New TV Shows list; its six-season run concluded in May 2018.

Historiography

As soon as the term "Cold War" was popularized to refer to post-war tensions between the United States and the Soviet Union, interpreting the course and origins of the conflict has been a source of heated controversy among historians, political scientists, and journalists. In particular, historians have sharply disagreed as to who was responsible for the breakdown of Soviet–US relations after the Second World War; and whether the conflict between the two superpowers was inevitable, or could have been avoided. Historians have also disagreed on what exactly the Cold War was, what the sources of the conflict were, and how to disentangle patterns of action and reaction between the two sides.

Although explanations of the origins of the conflict in academic discussions are complex and diverse, several general schools of thought on the subject can be identified. Historians commonly speak of three different approaches to the study of the Cold War: "orthodox" accounts, "revisionism", and "post-revisionism".

"Orthodox" accounts place responsibility for the Cold War on the Soviet Union and its expansion further into Europe. "Revisionist" writers place more responsibility for the breakdown of post-war peace on the United States, citing a range of US efforts to isolate and confront the Soviet Union well before the end of World War II. "Post-revisionists" see the events of the Cold War as more nuanced, and attempt to be more balanced in determining what occurred during the Cold War. Much of the historiography on the Cold War weaves together two or even all three of these broad categories.

See also

 Arab Cold War
 American espionage in the Soviet Union and Russian Federation
 American imperialism
 Canada in the Cold War
 Cold peace
 Cold War in Asia
 International relations since 1989
 Post–Cold War era
 McCarthyism
 Origins of the Cold War
 Outline of the Cold War
 Red Scare
 Second Cold War
 Soviet Empire
 Timeline of events in the Cold War
 :Category:Cold War by period

Footnotes

References

Sources

Books

 
 
 
 Ang, Cheng Guan. Southeast Asia's Cold War: An Interpretive History (University of Hawai’i Press, 2018). online review

Journals

News

Web

Further reading

 
 Brazinsky, Gregg A. Winning the Third World: Sino-American Rivalry during the Cold War (U of North Carolina Press, 2017); four online reviews & author response 
 
 Davis, Simon, and Joseph Smith. The A to Z of the Cold War (Scarecrow, 2005), encyclopedia focused on military aspects
 
 Feis, Herbert. From trust to terror; the onset of the cold war, 1945-1950 (1970) online free to borrow
 Fenby, Jonathan. Crucible: Thirteen Months that Forged Our World (2019) excerpt, covers 1947-1948
  on literature
 Fürst, Juliane, Silvio Pons and Mark Selden, eds. The Cambridge History of Communism (Volume 3): Endgames?.Late Communism in Global Perspective, 1968 to the Present (2017) excerpt
 
 
 Halliday, Fred. The Making of the Second Cold War (1983, Verso, London).
 Haslam, Jonathan. Russia's Cold War: From the October Revolution to the Fall of the Wall (Yale UP, 2011) 512 pages
 Hoffman, David E. The Dead Hand: The Untold Story of the Cold War Arms Race and Its Dangerous Legacy (2010)
 House, Jonathan. A Military History of the Cold War, 1944–1962 (2012)
 Judge, Edward H. The Cold War: A Global History With Documents (2012), includes primary sources.
 Kotkin, Stephen. Armageddon Averted: The Soviet Collapse, 1970-2000 (2nd ed. 2008) excerpt
 
 
 
 
 
 Matray, James I. ed. East Asia and the United States: An Encyclopedia of relations since 1784 (2 vol. Greenwood, 2002). excerpt v 2
Naimark, Norman Silvio Pons and Sophie Quinn-Judge, eds. The Cambridge History of Communism (Volume 2): The Socialist Camp and World Power, 1941-1960s (2017) excerpt
 Pons, Silvio, and Robert Service, eds. A Dictionary of 20th-Century Communism (2010).
 
 Priestland, David. The Red Flag: A History of Communism (Grove, 2009).
 Rupprecht, Tobias, Soviet internationalism after Stalin: Interaction and exchange between the USSR and Latin America during the Cold War. (Cambridge UP, 2015).
 Scarborough, Joe, Saving Freedom: Truman, The Cold War, and the Fight for Western Civilization, (2020), New York, Harper-Collins, 978-006-295-0512

External links

Archives
 The Cold War International History Project (CWIHP)
 The Cold War Files
 Select "Communism & Cold War" value to browse Maps from 1933–1982 at the Persuasive Cartography, The PJ Mode Collection, Cornell University Library
 CONELRAD Cold War Pop Culture Site
 CBC Digital Archives – Cold War Culture: The Nuclear Fear of the 1950s and 1960s

Bibliography
 Annotated bibliography for the arms race from the Alsos Digital Library

Educational resource
 Electronic Briefing Books at the National Security Archive, George Washington University

News 
  Video and audio news reports from during the cold war.

Films 
 André Bossuroy, Europe for Citizens Programme of the European Union, 

 
20th-century conflicts
Global conflicts
History of international relations
Wars involving the Soviet Union
Wars involving the United States
Soviet Union–United States relations
Aftermath of World War II
Geopolitical rivalry
Wars involving NATO
Nuclear warfare
1940s neologisms
History of NATO
Historical eras